Seán Casey (1922–1967) was an Irish politician.

Sean Casey may also refer to:

Sean Casey (baseball) (born 1974), baseball player
Sean Casey (Canadian politician) (born 1963), Canadian politician
Sean Casey (filmmaker) (born 1967), filmmaker and storm chaser
Sean Casey (rower) (born 1978), Irish Olympic rower
Sean Casey (rugby league), rugby league footballer
Sean Casey (wrestler) (born 1972), American professional wrestler
Sean Casey, a fictional character from the 1997 motion picture Night Falls on Manhattan
Shaun Casey, former head of the U.S. State Department's Office of Religion and Global Affairs

See also
Sean Carey (disambiguation)
Shaun Casey (born 1954), model
Seán O'Casey (1880–1964), Irish writer
Casey (surname)